Gary Dean Richrath (October 18, 1949 – September 13, 2015) was an American guitarist, best known as the lead guitarist and a songwriter for the band REO Speedwagon from 1970 until 1989.

Early life
Richrath was born in Peoria, Illinois, on October 18, 1949, to Curtis and Eunice Richrath, and grew up in East Peoria, Illinois. Originally playing saxophone in the school band, he took up guitar as a teenager, becoming self-taught. He graduated from East Peoria Community High School in 1967.

By 1968, Richrath was in a band called Suburban 9 to 5.

As lead guitarist and songwriter for REO Speedwagon
Richrath wrote, performed on and sang on some of REO Speedwagon's early hits, including "Golden Country" (1972), "Ridin' the Storm Out" (1973), "Find My Fortune" (1973), "Son of a Poor Man" (1973), "Wild as the Western Wind" (1974), "(Only A) Summer Love" (1976), "Flying Turkey Trot" (1976), "Only the Strong Survive" (1979) “In Your Letter” (1980) and "Take It On the Run" (1981).
In 1977, he and other members of the band took over production, which resulted in the band's first platinum album.
Along with playing lead guitar, Richrath sang lead vocals on "Find My Fortune" (1973), "Wild as the Western Wind" (1974), "Dance" (1975), "Any Kind of Love" (1976), "Only a Summer Love" (1976), "Breakaway" (1976) and "Tonight" (1976).

Solo career
Richrath left the band in 1989, and with his new band named Richrath, released the album Only the Strong Survive in 1992.

Later years
On November 22, 2013, REO Speedwagon and Styx announced a benefit concert titled "Rock to the Rescue" to raise money for families affected by a tornado in central Illinois. The concert was held on December 4, 2013 in Bloomington, Illinois. Richrath reunited with the band for a performance of "Ridin' the Storm Out" to end their set at the sold-out concert. Richrath stayed on stage to help with the encore of "With a Little Help From My Friends" along with REO Speedwagon, Styx, Richard Marx and others. Families affected by the storm and first-responders sat near the stage at this concert.

Death
Richrath died on September 13, 2015, with news of his death confirmed by his former REO Speedwagon bandmate Kevin Cronin. He was 65 years old. Speaking to the Songfacts website in 2017, Cronin disclosed the cause of Richrath's death: "He had some stomach problem or something and he went in the hospital to get treated for a stomach ailment and there were complications and he didn't make it."

Discography

REO Speedwagon
 1971 REO Speedwagon
 1972 R.E.O./T.W.O.
 1973 Ridin' the Storm Out
 1974 Lost in a Dream
 1975 This Time We Mean It
 1976 R.E.O.
 1977 Live: You Get What You Play For
 1978 You Can Tune a Piano but You Can't Tuna Fish
 1979 Nine Lives
 1980 A Decade of Rock and Roll 1970 to 1980
 1981 Hi Infidelity
 1982 Good Trouble
 1984 Wheels Are Turnin'
 1985 Best Foot Forward
 1987 Life as We Know It
 1988 The Hits
 1991 The Second Decade of Rock and Roll 1981 to 1991
 1993 Star Box
 1995 Believe in Rock And Roll
 1995 High Infidelity Gold
 1995 Subway in Tokyo
 1998 Only the Strong Survive - REO
 1998 Premium Best
 1999 The Ballads
 2004 The Essential REO Speedwagon
 2008 Playlist: The Very Best of REO Speedwagon
 2010 Setlist: The Very Best of REO Speedwagon Live

Richrath
 1992 Only the Strong Survive

References

External links
 Review of Gary Richrath on Guitar Jam Daily
 Gary Richrath at Legacy.com

1949 births
2015 deaths
People from East Peoria, Illinois
American rock guitarists
American male guitarists
American male songwriters
REO Speedwagon members
Guitarists from Illinois
20th-century American guitarists
20th-century American male musicians